Harrison Ford (born July 13, 1942) is an American actor. He has been a leading man in films of several genres and is regarded as an American cultural icon. His films have grossed more than $5.4billion in North America and more than $9.3billion worldwide, making him the seventh-highest-grossing actor in North America. He is the recipient of various accolades, including the AFI Life Achievement Award in 2000, the Cecil B. DeMille Award in 2002 and an Honorary César in 2010 in addition to nominations for an Academy Award and four Golden Globe Awards.
	
Following the initial phase of his career in bit parts and supporting roles, Ford gained worldwide fame for his starring role as Han Solo in the epic space opera film Star Wars (1977), reprising the role in four sequels over the course of the next 42 years. He is also widely known for his portrayal of Indiana Jones in the titular film franchise, beginning with the action-adventure film Raiders of the Lost Ark (1981), and for playing other characters in different franchises, most notably Rick Deckard in the dystopian science fiction films Blade Runner (1982) and Blade Runner 2049 (2017) and the Tom Clancy character Jack Ryan in the spy thriller films Patriot Games (1992) and Clear and Present Danger (1994).

His career spans six decades and includes collaborations with some of the most acclaimed and influential filmmakers of his time, such as George Lucas, Francis Ford Coppola, Steven Spielberg, Ridley Scott, Peter Weir, Roman Polanski and Mike Nichols. Ford received his only Academy Award for Best Actor nomination for his role in Witness (1985). He starred in heroic roles in Witness (1985), The Fugitive (1993), Air Force One (1997), Cowboys & Aliens (2011), and 42 (2013) as well as morally complex roles in the films American Graffiti (1973), The Conversation (1974), The Mosquito Coast (1986), Presumed Innocent (1990), and What Lies Beneath (2000). Ford has also starred in the romantic films Heroes (1977), Working Girl (1988), Sabrina (1995), Six Days, Seven Nights (1998), Random Hearts (1999), Morning Glory (2010), and The Age of Adaline (2015).

He is set to appear in the Marvel Cinematic Universe (MCU) portraying Thaddeus Ross, a role previously played by the late William Hurt. He is currently stars in the Paramount+ western series 1923 (2022–present) and the Apple TV+ comedy series Shrinking (2023). Outside acting, Ford is a licensed pilot who has often assisted the emergency services in rescue missions near his home in Wyoming. He is also a dedicated environmental activist, having served as the inaugural Vice Chair of Conservation International since 1991. He is married to actress Calista Flockhart.

Early life
Harrison Ford was born at the Swedish Covenant Hospital in Chicago, Illinois, on July 13, 1942, to former radio actress Dorothy (née Nidelman) and advertising executive and former actor John William "Christopher" Ford. His younger brother, Terence, was born in 1945. Their father was a Catholic of German and Irish descent, while their mother was an Ashkenazi Jew whose parents were emigrants from Minsk, Belarus, then in the Russian Empire. When asked in which religion he and his brother were raised, Ford jokingly responded "Democrat" and more seriously stated that they were raised to be "liberals of every stripe". When asked about what influence his Jewish and Irish Catholic ancestry may have had on him, he quipped, "As a man I've always felt Irish, as an actor I've always felt Jewish."

Ford was a Boy Scout, achieving the second-highest rank of Life Scout. He worked at Napowan Adventure Base Scout Camp as a counselor for the Reptile Study merit badge. Because of this, he and director Steven Spielberg later decided to depict the young Indiana Jones as a Life Scout in Indiana Jones and the Last Crusade (1989). Ford graduated in 1960 from Maine East High School in Park Ridge, Illinois. His voice was the first student voice broadcast on his high school's new radio station, WMTH, and he was its first sportscaster during his senior year. He attended Ripon College in Ripon, Wisconsin, where he was a philosophy major and a member of the Sigma Nu fraternity. A self-described "late bloomer", Ford took a drama class in the final quarter of his senior year to get over his shyness and became fascinated with acting.

Career

1964–1976
In 1964, after a season of summer stock with the Belfry Players in Wisconsin, Ford traveled to Los Angeles to apply for a job in radio voice-overs. He did not get it, but stayed in California and eventually signed a $150-per-week contract with Columbia Pictures' new talent program, playing bit roles in films. His first known role was an uncredited one as a bellhop in Dead Heat on a Merry-Go-Round (1966). There is little record of his non-speaking (or "extra") roles in film. Ford was at the bottom of the hiring list, having offended producer Jerry Tokofsky after he played a bellboy in the feature. He was told by Tokovsky that when actor Tony Curtis delivered a bag of groceries, he did it like a movie star; Ford felt his job was to act like a bellboy.

His speaking roles continued next with Luv (1967), though he was still uncredited. He was finally credited as "Harrison J. Ford" in the 1967 Western film A Time for Killing, starring Glenn Ford, George Hamilton and Inger Stevens, but the "J" did not stand for anything since he has no middle name. It was added to avoid confusion with a silent film actor named Harrison Ford, who appeared in more than 80 films between 1915 and 1932 and died in 1957. Ford later said that he was unaware of the existence of the earlier actor until he came upon a star with his own name on the Hollywood Walk of Fame. Ford soon dropped the "J" and worked for Universal Studios, playing minor roles in many television series throughout the late 1960s and early 1970s, including Gunsmoke, Ironside, The Virginian, The F.B.I., Love, American Style and Kung Fu. He appeared in the western Journey to Shiloh (1968) and had an uncredited, non-speaking role in Michelangelo Antonioni's 1970 film Zabriskie Point as an arrested student protester. French filmmaker Jacques Demy chose Ford for the lead role of his first American film, Model Shop (1969), but the head of Columbia Pictures thought Ford had "no future" in the film business and told Demy to hire a more experienced actor. The part eventually went to Gary Lockwood. Ford later commented that the experience had been nevertheless a positive one because Demy was the first to show such faith in him.

Not happy with the roles offered to him, Ford became a self-taught professional carpenter to support his then-wife and two young sons. Clients at this time included the writers Joan Didion and John Gregory Dunne, who lived on the beach at Malibu. Ford appears in the documentary Joan Didion: The Center Will Not Hold. He and his wife became friends of the writers. Casting director and fledgling producer Fred Roos championed the young Ford and secured him an audition with George Lucas for the role of Bob Falfa, which Ford went on to play in American Graffiti (1973). Ford's relationship with Lucas profoundly affected his career later. After director Francis Ford Coppola's film The Godfather was a success, he hired Ford to expand his office and gave him small roles in his next two films, The Conversation (1974) and Apocalypse Now (1979); in the latter film, Ford played an army officer named "G. Lucas".

1977–1997
Ford began to receive bigger roles in films throughout the late 1970s, including Heroes (1977), Force 10 from Navarone (1978) and Hanover Street (1979). Ford also co-starred alongside Gene Wilder in the buddy-comedy western  The Frisco Kid (1979), playing a bank robber with a heart of gold. His previous work in American Graffiti eventually landed him his first starring film role when he was hired by Lucas to read lines for actors auditioning for roles in Lucas' upcoming epic space-opera film Star Wars (1977). Lucas was eventually won over by Ford's performance during these line reads and cast him as Han Solo. Star Wars became one of the most successful and groundbreaking films of all time, and brought Ford, and his co-stars Mark Hamill and Carrie Fisher, widespread recognition. He returned to star in the similarly successful Star Wars sequels The Empire Strikes Back (1980) and Return of the Jedi (1983), as well as the Star Wars Holiday Special (1978). Ford wanted Lucas to kill off Han Solo at the end of Return of the Jedi, saying, "That would have given the whole film a bottom," but Lucas refused.

Ford's status as a leading actor was solidified with Raiders of the Lost Ark (1981), an action-adventure collaboration between George Lucas and Steven Spielberg that gave Ford his second franchise role as the heroic, globe-trotting archaeologist Indiana Jones. Like Star Wars, the film was massively successful and became the highest-grossing film of the year. Spielberg was interested in casting Ford from the beginning, but Lucas was not, having already worked with the actor in American Graffiti and Star Wars. Lucas eventually relented after Tom Selleck was unable to accept. Ford went on to reprise the role throughout the rest of the decade in the prequel Indiana Jones and the Temple of Doom (1984), and the sequel Indiana Jones and the Last Crusade. During the June 1983 filming of Temple of Doom in London, Ford herniated a disc in his back. The 40-year-old actor was forced to fly back to Los Angeles for surgery and returned six weeks later.

Following his leading-man success as Indiana Jones, he played Rick Deckard in Ridley Scott's dystopian science-fiction film Blade Runner (1982). Compared to his experiences on the Star Wars and Indiana Jones films, Ford had a difficult time with the production. He recalled to Vanity Fair, “It was a long slog. I didn’t really find it that physically difficult—I thought it was mentally difficult.” Ford and Scott also had differing views on the nature of his character, Deckard, that persist decades later. While not initially a success, Blade Runner went on to become a cult classic and one of Ford's most highly regarded films. Ford also proved his versatility throughout the 1980s with dramatic parts in films such as Witness (1985), The Mosquito Coast (1986), and Frantic (1988) as well as the romantic male lead opposite Melanie Griffith and Sigourney Weaver in the comedy-drama Working Girl (1988). Witness and The Mosquito Coast in particular allowed Ford to explore his potential as a dramatic actor and both performances were widely acclaimed. Ford later recalled that working with director Peter Weir on both Witness and The Mosquito Coast  were two of the best experiences of his career.

In the 1990s, Ford became the second actor to portray Jack Ryan in two films of the film series based on the literary character created by Tom Clancy: Patriot Games (1992) and Clear and Present Danger (1994), both co-starring Anne Archer and James Earl Jones. Ford took over the role from Alec Baldwin who had played Ryan in The Hunt for Red October (1990). This led to a long-lasting resentment from Baldwin who stated that he wanted to reprise the role but Ford had negotiated with Paramount behind his back. Ford also played leading roles in other action-based thrillers throughout the decade such as the critically acclaimed The Fugitive (1993), The Devil's Own (1997), and Air Force One (1997). For his performance in The Fugitive, which also co-starred Tommy Lee Jones, Ford received some of the best reviews of his career, including from Roger Ebert who concluded that, "Ford is once again the great modern movie everyman. As an actor, nothing he does seems merely for show, and in the face of this melodramatic material he deliberately plays down, lays low, gets on with business instead of trying to exploit the drama in meaningless acting flourishes." He also played more straight dramatic roles in Presumed Innocent (1990) and Regarding Henry (1991) as well as another romantic lead in Sabrina (1995), a remake of a classic 1954 film with the same name.

Ford established working relationships with many well-regarded directors during this time, including Peter Weir, Alan J. Pakula, Mike Nichols, Phillip Noyce, and Sydney Pollack, collaborating twice with each of them. This was the most lucrative period of Ford's career. From 1977 to 1997, he appeared in fourteen films that reached the top fifteen in the yearly domestic box office rankings, twelve of which reached the top ten. Six of the films he appeared in during this time were also nominated for the Academy Award for Best Picture amongst numerous other awards: Star Wars, Apocalypse Now, Raiders of the Lost Ark, Witness, Working Girl, and The Fugitive.

1998–2014
In the late 1990s, Ford started appearing in several critically derided and/or commercially disappointing films that failed to match his earlier successes, including Six Days, Seven Nights (1998), Random Hearts (1999), K-19: The Widowmaker (2002), Hollywood Homicide (2003), Firewall (2006) and Extraordinary Measures (2010). One exception was What Lies Beneath (2000) which grossed over $155million in the United States and $291million worldwide. Ford served as an executive producer on K-19: The Widowmaker and Extraordinary Measures, both of which were based on true events.

In 2004, Ford declined a chance to star in the thriller Syriana, later commenting that "I didn't feel strongly enough about the truth of the material and I think I made a mistake." The role eventually went to George Clooney, who won an Oscar and a Golden Globe for his work. Prior to that, Ford had passed on a role in another Stephen Gaghan-written film, that of Robert Wakefield in Traffic, which eventually went to Michael Douglas.

In 2008, Ford enjoyed success with the release of Indiana Jones and the Kingdom of the Crystal Skull, the first Indiana Jones film in nineteen years and another collaboration with Lucas and Spielberg. The film received generally positive reviews and was the second highest-grossing film worldwide in 2008. Ford later said he would like to star in another sequel, "...if it didn't take another 20 years to digest."

Other 2008 work included Crossing Over, directed by Wayne Kramer. In the film, Ford plays an ICE/Homeland Security Investigations Special Agent, working alongside Ashley Judd and Ray Liotta. He also narrated a feature documentary film about the Dalai Lama entitled Dalai Lama Renaissance. Ford filmed the medical drama Extraordinary Measures in 2009 in Portland, Oregon. Released January 22, 2010, the film also starred Brendan Fraser and Alan Ruck. Also in 2010, he co-starred in the film Morning Glory, along with Rachel McAdams, Diane Keaton and Patrick Wilson. Although the film was a disappointment at the box office, Ford's performance was well received by critics, some of whom thought it was his best role in years. In July 2011, Ford starred alongside Daniel Craig and Olivia Wilde in the science-fiction/western hybrid film Cowboys & Aliens. To promote the film, Ford appeared at the San Diego Comic-Con International and, apparently surprised by the warm welcome, told the audience, "I just wanted to make a living as an actor. I didn't know about this." Also in 2011, Ford starred in Japanese commercials advertising the video game Uncharted 3: Drake's Deception for the PlayStation 3.

2013 began a trend that saw Ford accepting more diverse supporting roles. That year, Ford co-starred in the corporate espionage thriller Paranoia with Liam Hemsworth and Gary Oldman, who he had previously worked with in Air Force One, and he also appeared in Ender's Game, 42 and Anchorman 2: The Legend Continues. His performance as Branch Rickey in the film 42 was praised by many critics and garnered Ford a nomination as best supporting actor for the Satellite Awards. In 2014, he appeared in The Expendables 3 and the documentary Flying the Feathered Edge: The Bob Hoover Project. The next year, Ford co-starred with Blake Lively in the romantic drama The Age of Adaline to positive notices.

2015–present

Ford reprised the role of Han Solo in the long-awaited Star Wars sequel Star Wars: The Force Awakens (2015), which became highly successful like its predecessors. During filming on June 11, 2014, Ford suffered what was said to be a fractured ankle when a hydraulic door fell on him. He was airlifted to John Radcliffe Hospital in Oxford, England, for treatment. Ford's son Ben released details on his father's injury, saying that his ankle would likely need a plate and screws, and that filming could be altered slightly with the crew needing to shoot Ford from the waist up for a short time until he recovered. Ford made his return to filming in mid-August, after a two-month layoff as he recovered from his injury. Ford's character was killed off in The Force Awakens, but it was subsequently announced, via a casting call, that Ford would return in some capacity as Solo in Episode VIII. In February 2016, when the cast for Episode VIII was confirmed, it was indicated that Ford would not reprise his role in the film after all. When Ford was asked if his character could come back in "some form", he replied, "Anything is possible in space." He eventually made an uncredited appearance as a vision in Star Wars: The Rise of Skywalker (2019).

On February 26, 2015, Alcon Entertainment announced Ford would reprise his role as Rick Deckard in Blade Runner 2049. The film, and Ford's performance, was very well received by critics upon its release in October 2017. Scott Collura of IGN called it a, "deep, rich, smart film that's visually awesome and full of great sci-fi concepts" and Ford's role, "a quiet, sort of gut-wrenching interpretation to Deckard and what he must've gone through in the past three decades."  The film grossed $259.3million worldwide, far short of the estimated $400million that the film needed in order to break even. In 2019, Ford had his first voice role in an animated film, as a dog named Rooster in The Secret Life of Pets 2. With filming for a fifth Indiana Jones film having been delayed by a year, Ford headlined a big-budget adaptation of Jack London's The Call of the Wild, playing prospector John Thornton. The film was released in February 2020 to a mixed critical reception but its theatrical release was shortened due to the impact of the COVID-19 pandemic on the film industry.

Ford will reprise the role of Indiana Jones in Indiana Jones and the Dial of Destiny (2023), which he has said will be his last appearance as the character. In October 2022, Ford was cast as Thaddeus "Thunderbolt" Ross in the 2024 films Captain America: New World Order and Thunderbolts, set in the Marvel Cinematic Universe, replacing actor William Hurt who played the character in previous MCU films.

Personal life

Ford has been married three times and has four biological children and one adopted child. He was first married to Mary Marquardt from 1964 until their divorce in 1979. They had two sons, chef and restaurateur Benjamin (born 1966) and clothier Willard (born 1969). Benjamin co-owns Ford's Filling Station, a gastropub with locations at L.A. Live in Los Angeles and Terminal 5 in Los Angeles International Airport. Willard is the owner of Strong Sports Gym, and was co-owner of the Kim Sing Theater and owner of the Ludwig Clothing company.

Ford's second marriage was to screenwriter Melissa Mathison from March 1983 until their separation in 2000 and finalized divorce in 2004. They had a son, actor and musician Malcolm (born 1987), and a daughter, actress Georgia (born 1990). Mathison died in 2015.

Ford began dating actress Calista Flockhart after they met at the 2002 Golden Globe Awards. He proposed to Flockhart over Valentine's Day weekend in 2009. They married on June 15, 2010, in Santa Fe, New Mexico, where Ford was filming Cowboys & Aliens. They are the parents of Liam (born 2001), the son she adopted before meeting Ford. 

Ford and Flockhart live on an  ranch in Jackson, Wyoming, on which he has lived since the 1980s and approximately half of which he has donated as a nature reserve. They retain a base in the Brentwood neighborhood of Los Angeles. He is one of Hollywood's most private actors, guarding much of his personal life. In her 2016 autobiography The Princess Diarist, his co-star Carrie Fisher claimed that she and Ford had a three-month affair in 1976 during the filming of Star Wars.

Aviation

Ford is a licensed pilot of both fixed-wing aircraft and helicopters. On several occasions, he has personally provided emergency helicopter services at the request of local authorities in Wyoming, in one instance rescuing a hiker overcome by dehydration.

Ford began flight training in the 1960s at Wild Rose Idlewild Airport in Wild Rose, Wisconsin, flying in a Piper PA-22 Tri-Pacer, but at $15 an hour, he could not afford to continue the training. In the mid-1990s, he bought a used Gulfstream II and asked one of his pilots, Terry Bender, to give him flying lessons. They started flying a Cessna 182 out of Jackson, Wyoming, later switching to Teterboro, New Jersey, flying a Cessna 206, the aircraft in which he made his first solo flight.

Ford's aircraft is kept at Santa Monica Airport. The Bell 407 is often kept and flown in Jackson and has been used by the actor in two mountain rescues during his assigned duty time with Teton County Search and Rescue. On one of the rescues, Ford recovered a hiker who had become lost and disoriented. She boarded Ford's helicopter and promptly vomited into one of the rescuers' caps, unaware of who the pilot was until much later; "I can't believe I barfed in Harrison Ford's helicopter!" she said later.

Ford flies his de Havilland Canada DHC-2 Beaver (N28S) more than any of his other aircraft, and has repeatedly said that he likes this aircraft and the sound of its Pratt & Whitney R-985 radial engine. According to Ford, it had been flown in the CIA's Air America operations and was riddled with bullet holes that had to be patched up.

In March 2004, Ford officially became chairman of the Experimental Aircraft Association (EAA)'s Young Eagles program, founded by then-EAA president Tom Poberezny and fellow actor-pilot Cliff Robertson. Ford was asked to take the position by Greg Anderson, Senior Vice President of the EAA at the time, to replace General Chuck Yeager, who was vacating the post that he had held for many years. Ford at first was hesitant, but later accepted the offer and has made appearances with the Young Eagles at the EAA AirVenture Oshkosh gathering at Oshkosh, Wisconsin, for two years. In July 2005, at the gathering in Oshkosh, Ford agreed to accept the position for another two years. He has flown over 280 children as part of the Young Eagles program, usually in his DHC-2 Beaver, which can seat the actor and five children. Ford stepped down as program chairman in 2009 and was replaced by Captain Chesley Sullenberger and First Officer Jeff Skiles. He is involved with the EAA chapter in Driggs, Idaho, just over the Teton Range from Jackson, Wyoming. On July 28, 2016, Ford flew the two millionth Young Eagle at the EAA AirVenture convention, making it the most successful aviation-youth introduction program in history.

As of 2009, Ford appears in Internet advertisements for General Aviation Serves America, a campaign by the advocacy group Aircraft Owners and Pilots Association (AOPA). He has also appeared in several independent aviation documentaries, including Wings Over the Rockies (2009), Flying The Feathered Edge: The Bob Hoover Project (2014) and Living in the Age of Airplanes (2015).

Ford is an honorary board member of the humanitarian aviation organization Wings of Hope, and is known for having made several trips to Washington, D.C., to fight for pilots' rights. He has also donated substantial funds to aerobatic champion Sean Tucker's charitable program, The Bob Hoover Academy (named after legendary aviator Bob Hoover) which educates at-risk teens in central California and teaches them how to fly.

Incidents
On August 22, 1987, Ford was traveling with Clint Eastwood and Sondra Locke aboard a Gulfstream III when the jet developed trouble during a Paris-to-L.A. flight and was forced to land in Bangor, Maine. The trio spent the night at a hotel and after repairs and refueling resumed their flight the following day.

On October 23, 1999, Ford was involved in the crash of a Bell 206L4 LongRanger helicopter. The NTSB accident report states that Ford was piloting the aircraft over the Lake Piru riverbed near Santa Clarita, California, on a routine training flight. While making his second attempt at an autorotation with powered recovery, the aircraft was unable to recover power after the sudden drop in altitude. It landed hard and began skidding forward in the loose gravel before flipping onto its side. Neither Ford nor the instructor pilot suffered any injuries, though the helicopter was seriously damaged.

On March 5, 2015, Ford's plane, believed to be a Ryan PT-22 Recruit, made an emergency landing on the Penmar Golf Course in Venice, California. He was taken to Ronald Reagan UCLA Medical Center, where he was reported to be in fair to moderate condition. Ford suffered a broken pelvis and broken ankle during the accident, as well as other injuries.

On February 13, 2017, Ford landed an Aviat Husky at John Wayne Airport in Orange County, California, on the taxiway left of runway 20L. A Boeing 737 was holding short of the runway on the taxiway when Ford overflew them.

On April 24, 2020, at the Los Angeles Hawthorne Airport while piloting his Husky, Ford crossed a runway where another aircraft was landing. According to the FAA, the two planes were about 3,600 feet from each other and there was no danger of a crash. A representative of Ford later said that he "misheard" an instruction given to him by air traffic control.

Activism

Environmental work
Ford is vice-chair of Conservation International, an American nonprofit environmental organization headquartered in Arlington, Virginia. The organization's intent is to protect nature.

In September 2013, Ford, while filming an environmental documentary in Indonesia, interviewed the Indonesian Forestry Minister, Zulkifli Hasan. After the interview, Ford and his crew were accused of "harassing state institutions" and publicly threatened with deportation. Questions within the interview concerned the Tesso Nilo National Park, Sumatra. It was alleged the Minister of Forestry was given no prior warning of questions nor the chance to explain the challenges of catching people with illegal logging. Ford was provided an audience with the Indonesian President, Susilo Bambang Yudhoyono, during which he expressed concerns regarding Indonesia's environmental degradation and the government efforts to address climate change. In response, the President explained Indonesia's commitment to preserving its oceans and forests.

In 1993, the arachnologist Norman Platnick named a new species of spider Calponia harrisonfordi, and in 2002, the entomologist Edward O. Wilson named a new ant species Pheidole harrisonfordi (in recognition of Harrison's work as Vice Chairman of Conservation International).

Since 1992, Ford has lent his voice to a series of public service messages promoting environmental involvement for EarthShare, an American federation of environmental and conservation charities. He has acted as a spokesperson for Restore Hetch Hetchy, a non-profit organization dedicated to restoring Yosemite National Park's Hetch Hetchy Valley to its original condition. Ford also appears in the documentary series Years of Living Dangerously, which reports on people affected by and seeking solutions to climate change.

In 2019, on behalf of Conservation International, Ford gave an impassioned speech during the United Nations' Climate Action Summit in New York on the destruction of the Amazon rainforest and its effect on climate change for the rest of the world. Ford urged his audience to listen to 'angry young people' trying to make a difference in the situation, emphasizing, "The most important thing we can do for them is to get the hell out of their way."

Political views
Like his parents, Ford is a lifelong Democrat.

On September 7, 1995, Ford testified before the U.S. Senate Foreign Relations Committee in support of the Dalai Lama and an independent Tibet. In 2007, he narrated the documentary Dalai Lama Renaissance. In 2000, Ford donated a thousand dollars to the presidential campaigns of Bill Bradley, Al Gore and John McCain.

In 2003, he publicly condemned the Iraq War and called for "regime change" in the United States. He also criticized Hollywood for making movies which were "more akin to video games than stories about human life and relationships", and he called for more gun control in the United States.

After Republican presidential candidate Donald Trump said his favorite role of Ford's was Air Force One because he "stood up for America", Ford responded that it was just a film and made critical statements against Trump's presidential bid.

For his first time ever endorsing a political candidate for office, Ford endorsed Joe Biden's 2020 presidential campaign against Donald Trump. He said that he wanted to "encourage people to support candidates that will support the environment" and felt that under Trump, the United States has "lost some of our credibility in the world". Along with Mark Hamill, Ford worked with the anti-Trump Republican group The Lincoln Project to produce and narrate a 2020 election ad attacking Trump's disparaging of Anthony Fauci.

In 2009, Ford signed a petition calling for the release of film director Roman Polanski, who had been arrested in Switzerland in relation to his 1977 charge for drugging and raping a 13-year-old girl.

Archaeology
Following on his success portraying the archaeologist Indiana Jones, Ford also plays a part in supporting the work of professional archaeologists. He serves as a General Trustee on the Governing Board of the Archaeological Institute of America (AIA), North America's oldest and largest organization devoted to the world of archaeology. Ford assists them in their mission of increasing public awareness of archaeology and preventing looting and the illegal antiquities trade.

Star Wars: Force for Change
Ford participated in a Star Wars promotion geared toward fans who donated to Star Wars: Force for Change on video call which offered them the opportunity to purchase tickets to the premiere of The Force Awakens.

Filmography

Awards

Throughout his career, Ford has received significant recognition for his work in the entertainment industry. In 1986, he was nominated for Best Actor at the 58th Academy Awards for his performance in Witness, a role for which he also received BAFTA and Golden Globe nominations in the same category. Three additional Golden Globe nominations went to Ford in 1987, 1994 and 1996 for his performances in The Mosquito Coast, The Fugitive and Sabrina. In 2000, he was the recipient of the AFI Life Achievement Award from the American Film Institute for his body of work, presented to him by two of his closest collaborators and fellow industry giants, George Lucas and Steven Spielberg. In 2002, he was given the Cecil B. DeMille Award, another career achievement honor, from the Hollywood Foreign Press Association at the 59th Golden Globe Awards ceremony. On May 30, 2003, Ford received a star on the Hollywood Walk of Fame.

In 2006, he received the Jules Verne Award, given to an actor who has "encouraged the spirit of adventure and imagination" throughout their career. He was presented with the first-ever Hero Award at the 2007 Scream Awards for his many iconic roles, including Indiana Jones and Han Solo (both of which earned him two Saturn Awards for Best Actor in 1982 and 2016, respectively), and in 2008 he received the Spike TV's Guy's Choice Award for "Brass Balls". In 2015, Ford received the Albert R. Broccoli Britannia Award for Worldwide Contribution to Entertainment from BAFTA Los Angeles. In 2018, Ford was honored by the SAG-AFTRA Foundation with the Artists Inspiration Award for both his acting and philanthropic work alongside fellow honoree Lady Gaga. SAG-AFTRA Foundation Board President JoBeth Williams in the press release said, “Harrison Ford is an acting legend in every known galaxy, but what many do not know are the decades of philanthropic service and leadership he has given to Conservation International to help protect our planet."

Other prestigious film honors for Ford include the Honorary Cesar, the Career Achievement Award from the Hollywood Film Awards, the Kirk Douglas Award for Excellence in Film from the Santa Barbara International Film Festival, the Box Office Star of the Century Award from the National Association of Theatre Owners and the Lifetime Achievement Award from the Locarno Film Festival.

In 2013 he was honored with a Lifetime Achievement Award at Zurich Film Festival.

Ford has also been honored multiple times for his involvement in general aviation, receiving the Living Legends of Aviation Award and the Experimental Aircraft Association's Freedom of Flight Award in 2009, the Wright Brothers Memorial Trophy in 2010, and the Al Ueltschi Humanitarian Award in 2013. Flying magazine ranked him number 48 on their 2013 list of the 51 Heroes of Aviation.

References

External links

 Harrison Ford interview on KVUE about The Mosquito Coast in 1986 from Texas Archive of the Moving Image
 
 
 Harrison Ford at Hollywood Walk of Fame

20th-century American male actors
21st-century American male actors
1942 births
Activists from California
Actors from Park Ridge, Illinois
Actors Fund of America
AFI Life Achievement Award recipients
American carpenters
American conservationists
American male film actors
American male television actors
American male video game actors
American male voice actors
American people of Belarusian-Jewish descent
American people of Irish descent
Aviators from Illinois
California Democrats
Cecil B. DeMille Award Golden Globe winners
César Honorary Award recipients
Film producers from Illinois
Living people
Male actors from Chicago
Ripon College (Wisconsin) alumni
Survivors of aviation accidents or incidents
American gun control activists
Experimental Aircraft Association